USTM may refer to:

 University of Science and Technology, Meghalaya, a University in Ri-Bhoi, Meghalaya, India
 Ultra short-term memory (USTM), capacity for holding a small amount of information in mind in an active, readily available state for a short period of time